Hopea sulcata is a species of plant in the family Dipterocarpaceae. It is a tree endemic to Peninsular Malaysia.

References

sulcata
Endemic flora of Peninsular Malaysia
Trees of Peninsular Malaysia
Critically endangered flora of Asia
Taxonomy articles created by Polbot